Wombwell is a ward in the metropolitan borough of Barnsley, South Yorkshire, England.  The ward contains four listed buildings that are recorded in the National Heritage List for England.  All the listed buildings are designated at Grade II, the lowest of the three grades, which is applied to "buildings of national importance and special interest".  The ward contains the town of Wombwell, and the listed buildings are a church, two cemetery chapels and a war memorial plaque.


Buildings

References

Citations

Sources

 

Lists of listed buildings in South Yorkshire
Buildings and structures in the Metropolitan Borough of Barnsley